Izuchukwu Jude Anthony (born 3 November 1997) is a professional Nigerian footballer who plays as a centre back for Saudi Arabian club Al-Khaleej.

Club career
On 30 January 2016, Anthony signed a three-year contract with Haugesund.

On 20 August 2022, Anthony joined Saudi Arabian club Al-Khaleej on a one-year deal.

Career statistics

References

External links
 Izuchuckwu Anthony at Nest-Sotra's website
 

1997 births
Living people
Nigerian footballers
FK Haugesund players
FK Jerv players
Nest-Sotra Fotball players
FC Spartak Trnava players
Hapoel Haifa F.C. players
Khaleej FC players
Eliteserien players
Norwegian First Division players
Slovak Super Liga players
Israeli Premier League players
Saudi Professional League players
Nigerian expatriate footballers
Expatriate footballers in Norway
Expatriate footballers in Slovakia
Expatriate footballers in Israel
Expatriate footballers in Saudi Arabia
Nigerian expatriate sportspeople in Norway
Nigerian expatriate sportspeople in Slovakia
Nigerian expatriate sportspeople in Israel
Nigerian expatriate sportspeople in Saudi Arabia
Nigeria youth international footballers
Association football defenders